Franquemont may refer to:

Places
Franquemont, ancient lordship on the banks of the river Doubs in present France and Switzerland

People
Abby Franquemont (born 1972), American textile crafts writer and author
Frederic von Franquemont (1770-1842), Württemberg Infantry General